MV Skookum, not to be confused with the 1906 ferry MV Skookum, was a ferry that linked the communities of Naramata and Summerland on Okanagan Lake in British Columbia, Canada.

The Okanagan Lake Boat Company was first incorporated by pioneer John Moore Robinson in 1909 before going under the management of Peter Roe in 1912. It was later purchased by the Naramata Syndicate, which began a new line of larger and more modern boats. Skookum was the first of these; she was a -long motor launch that could carry 60 passengers. The Naramata Syndicate also built scows for freight and cargo to assist Skookum and the other ferries.

In November, 1913, Skookum collided with the Canadian Pacific Railway company's SS Castlegar between the communities Trout Creek and Penticton.

References

Ferries of British Columbia
History of British Columbia
Culture of the Okanagan